Ann Veasman Clemmer (born August 10, 1958) is an American political scientist and politician from the U.S. state of Arkansas. A Republican, Clemmer is a former member of the Arkansas House of Representatives, having represented District 23 from 2013 to 2015. She was sworn in for her first term in 2009 in House District 29. Clemmer is also credited as being the first woman ever to preside over the Arkansas House in the state's history, during the 2014 special session held in the Old State House; it was the first time the state legislature convened in the building in more than a century.

Background

State House career

In 2008, Clemmer won her first term in the state House in District 29, when she defeated the Democrat Scott Smith, 9,505 (63.3 percent) to 5,518 (36.7 percent). She was unopposed in 2010 and 2012, when she was transferred to District 23 for her third and final term in the state House.

Clemmer is a member of the Arkansas Legislative Council and Vice Chairman of the House Education Committee. She also sits on the House committees on (1) Rules and (2) State Agencies and Governmental Affairs. She is a member of the subcommittees on Early Childhood, Higher Education, and House Elections.

On May 20, 2014, Clemmer finished second in a three-way primary with only 22% of the vote in the Republican primary for Arkansas's 2nd congressional district seat in the United States House of Representatives. The position was vacated by U.S. Representative Tim Griffin, who was subsequently elected lieutenant governor.  Her congressional race was severely hurt by a scandal involving Clemmer's treasurer, Alex Reed, allegedly embezzling a large amount from her congressional campaign account and was forced to resign.

References

External links
 

1958 births
Living people
People from Mississippi County, Arkansas
People from Benton, Arkansas
Republican Party members of the Arkansas House of Representatives
University of Arkansas at Little Rock faculty
Arkansas State University alumni
American Protestants